Lithophane lanei is a species of cutworm or dart moth in the family Noctuidae. It is found in North America.

The MONA or Hodges number for Lithophane lanei is 9893.1.

References

Further reading

 
 
 

lanei
Articles created by Qbugbot
Moths described in 2006